Scaevola enantophylla, commonly known as climbing fan-flower,is a species of flowering plant in the family Goodeniaceae and is endemic to Queensland. It is a scrambling vine with yellow fan-shaped flowers, and the only species in the genus with leaves arranged opposite.

Description

Taxonomy
Scaevola enantophylla was first formally described in 1873 by Ferdinand von Mueller and the description was published in Fragmenta Phytographiae Australiae.

Distribution and habitat
Climbing fan-flower grows near forests on the east coast of Queensland.

References

External links
Scaevola enantophylla (Flickr)
Scaevola enantophylla Images (North Queensland Plants)
Scaevola enantophylla: Isotype (U0253443) collected J.Dallachy at Rockingham Bay

enantophylla
Species described in 1873
Plants described in 1873
Taxa named by Ferdinand von Mueller
Flora of Queensland